Central College is a private college located in Pella, Iowa, and affiliated with the Reformed Church in America. The college was founded in 1853 and has been accredited by the Higher Learning Commission since 1942. Central has a student body of approximately 1,100 undergraduates and 73 academic programs.

History

The Baptist Convention of Iowa founded Central University of Iowa in 1853 and it officially opened on October 8, 1854. The first class totaled 37 people. Central was a Baptist institution until 1916, when it was transferred to the control of the Reformed Church in America. Since 1886, Iowa Baptists had shifted their post-secondary education interests to Des Moines College, and hoped to reduce Central to a feeder school.

The college was called Central University of Iowa (CUI), at least until 1991. It renamed itself "Central College" in 1994.

It was home to local radio station 89.1 KCUI-FM and the award-winning newspaper “The Ray.”

Central has a history of interesting architectural features. The first buildings of the new college in 1853 are Dutch Colonial and part of what was recently known as Strawtown Inn. The first dormitory, Cotton Hall, is noted for its ornate Victorian porch and stained glass windows. Building innovation continues with the addition of "green" buildings.

In September 2019 it was announced that Central College would lower their yearly tuition starting in the Fall 2020 semester, dropping to $18,600, from $38,600.

Campus
Central College's  campus is a few blocks from Pella's downtown square, two minutes from Iowa's largest lake and 40 minutes from Des Moines. Pella's annual Tulip Festival attracts more than 100,000 visitors each spring. Central is a residential campus where students can live in dormitories, townhouses, and apartment style "green pods."

The college's emphasis on sustainability has led to Leadership in Energy and Environmental Design (LEED) ratings from the U.S. Green Building Council. The Vermeer Science Center was Iowa's first LEED-rated building, and Howard McKee Hall received the first gold rating in the state. The newest building, Roe Center, received a platinum rating.

Major buildings 
Maytag Student Center—During the summer of 2014, the student center underwent a $3.1 million renovation to Maytag Student Center made possible by the Fred Maytag Family foundation. The renovations include a new workout facility, a new Student Activity Center and additional Fred's dining area.

The Roe Center—Named after Central's 20th president, Dr. David H. Roe, was completed in the fall of 2009. The $17 million facility houses the education, psychology and communication departments, as well as Community-Based Learning. Central was awarded a platinum Leadership in Energy and Environmental Design (LEED) rating from the United States Green Building Council (USGBC) for the design of the Roe Center. The facility features environmentally friendly building practices and an energy efficient building design, such as a green roof, natural ventilating system, radiant floor heating/cooling system and daylight harvesting systems.

Vermeer Science Center—Underwent a $20 million renovation in 2003, and was the first building in the state of Iowa and the first science building in the nation to be recognized as a green building by the U.S. Green Building Council. It was subsequently given a silver LEED (Leadership in Energy and Environmental Design) rating. The mathematics, computer science, physics, biology and chemistry departments are located in this building. Vermeer features many study spaces and quiet tables located outside the professors’ offices are to encourage student/faculty interaction.

Weller Center for Business and International Studies—Built in 1999, it was Central's first step in green building featuring natural light, solar panels and carpet out of recycled materials in every room. It contains the business, foreign language and international studies departments.

Central Market—Central's main dining facility. It is designed to resemble a European marketplace.

Geisler Library—Holds nearly a quarter of a million resources including books, magazines, newspapers, music, reference periodicals, microfilm, historical information and art.

Kuyper Athletic Complex—The Ron and Joyce Schipper Stadium received new Fieldturf in the summer of 2013. The field is surrounded by a 400-meter BSS 1000 polyurethane track which also house dual runways for jumping events and a two-way pole vault pit. The H.S. Kuyper Fieldshouse houses a 200-meter track and five tennis courts. The surface is Mondotrack, which is the same surface used in the 2008 Olympic games in Beijing.

Academics
Central offers 73 academic programs and pre-professional advising, including the college's newest major, engineering. The 14 pre-professional programs include medicine, law, nursing and pharmacy. Academic programs include: accounting, athletic training, biology, communication studies, computer science, education, music, natural science, physics and languages. 85 percent of faculty have a PhD or terminal degree. The average class size is 16 students and the student to faculty ratio is 12–1.

About 50 percent of Central students study abroad at some point. Central offers year-round programs around the world. Summer programs are also available in many locations.

Athletics

Central has 20 sports programs and competes in the ARC of the NCAA. Sports include: football, wrestling, volleyball, softball, baseball, women's triathlon; men's and women's golf, track, soccer, basketball and tennis. Cheerleading, dance team and intramural sports are also offered.

Highlights of Central athletics programs include:
 The football team has not had a losing season since 1960.
 The softball team has 25 Division III tournament berths and 13 finals appearances. They have four national champion titles.
 The volleyball team has three national titles—1998, 1999 and 2000.
 The track and field team combined has 35 individual championships. The men's program has 15 individual championships, with seven in the multi-event category. 
Central College's athletic teams include:

Men's sports
 Baseball
 Basketball
 Cross country
 Football (Top 25 in each of the past 3 decades.)
 Golf
 Soccer
 Tennis
 Track and Field
 Wrestling

Women's sports
 Basketball
 Cross country
 Golf
 Soccer
 Softball
 Tennis
 Track and Field
 Triathlon
 Volleyball

Student life
Central has over 100 clubs and activities for students to get involved with on campus. Students are also given the opportunity to create their own club and have it officially recognized by the college.

Clubs and Organizations Include intramural sports, mock trial, non-national Greek life, Campus Ministries, and more.

There are honorary organizations for theatre, chemistry, mathematics, art, music, history, political science, psychology, English and biology.

There are also 18 music ensembles available for participation on campus including a cappella choir, steel drum ensemble, pep band, jazz band, woodwind ensemble, community chorus and chamber singers.

Notable alumni

 Bernadette Allen, former United States Ambassador to Niger
 Bert Bandstra, (1950) Member of the United States House of Representatives from Iowa
 George Alfred Baitsell, United States biologist and official of the American Association for the Advancement of Science (B.S. 1908)
 Steve Bell, television reporter and anchor
 Cyrenus Cole, (1887) Member of the United States House of Representatives from Iowa
 Vern Den Herder, defensive end who was part of the Miami Dolphins' "No Name Defense" that won 2 consecutive Super Bowls, and is a member of the College Football Hall of Fame
 Cory Synhorst SerVaas, Editor, inventor, and doctor
 Adam Gregg, (2006) Lieutenant Governor of Iowa as of May 25, 2017. Public Defender of Iowa from December 8, 2014, to May 25, 2017.
 John Hospers, (1939) first U.S. presidential candidate for the Libertarian Party.
 Solomon F. Prouty, (1877) Member of the United States House of Representatives from Iowa
 Harry Smith, (1973) television reporter

References

Further reading

External links
 
 Athletics website

 
Educational institutions established in 1853
Education in Marion County, Iowa
Pella, Iowa
Buildings and structures in Marion County, Iowa
Tourist attractions in Marion County, Iowa
Private universities and colleges in Iowa
1853 establishments in Iowa
Reformed Church in America